Michael Banducci is an American professional poker player who won a 2008 World Series of Poker bracelet event.

, his total live tournament winnings exceed $959,000. His 10 cashes at the WSOP account for $853,732 of those winnings.

World Series of Poker 
Banducci has 10 career cashes at the World Series of Poker (WSOP). He made the final table in the $2,000 No Limit Hold'em event at the 2007 World Series of Poker won by Will Durkee. A year later on June 6, 2008 Banducci won his first World Series of Poker bracelet after defeating European Poker Tour Grand Champion Jeff Williams during heads-up play at the $1000 No Limit Holdem event at the 2008 World Series of Poker, earning $636,736.

World Series of Poker bracelets

Notes

Year of birth missing (living people)
American poker players
Living people
World Series of Poker bracelet winners